Stephen L. Vargo is an American academic in the field of marketing, currently serving as a professor at the University of Hawaiʻi.

Background 
Vargo has an MS degree in social psychology and a PhD in Marketing. He has previously worked or taught at the University of Maryland, the University of California Riverside, the University of Cambridge, the University of Auckland, and Karlstad University.

Career

Research 
Vargo’s primary areas of research are marketing theory and thought, service dominant logic (marketing), and consumers’ evaluative reference scales. He has had articles published in the Journal of Marketing, the Journal of the Academy of Marketing Science, the Journal of Service Research, the Journal of Retailing, the Journal of Macromarketing, and other major marketing journals and books, including, The Service Dominant Logic of Marketing: Dialog, Debate, and Directions, and The Sage Handbook on Service-Dominant Logic, which he co-edited and Service-Dominant Logic: Premises, Perspectives, Possibilities, which he coauthored..

Editorial positions 
Vargo currently serves on the editorial review boards of the Journal of Marketing, the Journal of the Academy of Marketing Science, Journal of Service Research, the Australasian Marketing Journal, and the Journal of Service Management and Service Science. He has also served as co-editor of a special issue of the Journal of the Academy of Marketing Science, as well as editor of special issues in other leading journals such as European Journal of Marketing and Marketing Theory and MIS Quarterly.

Publications
 Vargo, Stephen L. and Lusch, Robert F. (2004) ‘Evolving to a New Dominant Logic for Marketing’, Journal of Marketing 68 (January): 1 – 17.
 Vargo, Stephen L. and Lusch, Robert F. (2008) “Service-Dominant Logic: Continuing the Evolution,” Journal of the Academy of Marketing Science 36, 1-10.
 Vargo, Stephen L. and Lusch, Robert F. (2011) “It's all B2B…and beyond: Toward a systems perspective of the market,” Industrial Marketing Management 40, 181-187.
Vargo, Stephen L. and Robert F. Lusch (2016), “Institutions and Axioms: An Extension and Update Of Service-Dominant Logic,” Journal of the Academy of Marketing Science, 44(1), 5-23 (DOI: 10.1007/s11747-015-0456-3) 
Vargo, Stephen L. and Robert F. Lusch (2019), Sage Handbook of Service-Dominant Logic, London: Sage.

External links 
CV
 University of Hawaii at Manoa, Stephen Vargo
 Service-Dominant Logic Website
 Selected Publications on Service-Dominant Logic

Living people
University of Hawaiʻi faculty
1945 births
American business theorists
Marketing people
Marketing theorists
American marketing people